The Baja California peninsula is a peninsula in northwestern Mexico. It separates the Gulf of California from the Pacific Ocean. The peninsula extends from Mexicali, Baja California, in the north to Cabo San Lucas, Baja California Sur, in the south.

The peninsula is separated from mainland Mexico by the Gulf of California and the Colorado River. There are four main desert areas on the peninsula: the San Felipe Desert, the Central Coast Desert, the Vizcaíno Desert, and the Magdalena Plain Desert.

History

The land of California existed as a myth among European explorers before it was discovered. The earliest known mention of the idea of California was in the 1510 romance novel Las Sergas de Esplandián by Spanish author Garci Rodríguez de Montalvo. The book described the Island of California as being west of the Indies, "very close to the side of the Terrestrial Paradise; and it is peopled by black women, without any man among them, for they live in the manner of Amazons".

Following Hernán Cortés's conquest of Mexico, the lure of an earthly paradise as well as the search for the fabled Strait of Anián, helped motivate him to send several expeditions to the west coast of New Spain in the 1530s and early 1540s. In 1539, explorer Francisco de Ulloa proved that Baja California was a peninsula rather than an island. Nevertheless, the idea of the island persisted for well over a century and was included in many maps. The water separating the island, now called "Gulf of California" was sometimes called the "Red Sea". The Spaniards gave the name Las Californias to the peninsula and lands to the north, including both Baja California and Alta California, the region that became parts of the present-day U.S. states of California, Nevada, Utah, Arizona, and parts of Colorado and Wyoming.

Timeline
 "At the time of contact, Baja California Norte was primarily inhabited by several indigenous groups belonging to the Yuman language branch of the Hokan linguistic family." Other indigenous groups in Baja California at the time of first contact include the Paipai, Kumeyaay (Kumiai), Cochimí, Cucapás (Cocopá), Kiliwa, Guaycura (Guaicura or Waicuri), and Pericú peoples. 
1532: Hernán Cortés sends three ships north along the coast of Mexico in search of the Island of California. The three ships disappear without a trace.
1533: Cortés sends a follow-up mission to search for the lost ships. Pilot Fortún Ximénez leads a mutiny and founds a settlement in the Bay of La Paz before being killed.
1539: Francisco de Ulloa explores both coasts.
1578 or 1579: The San Juanillo was the Manila galleon which wrecked on a beach at Baja California in late 1578 or early 1579 became the first shipwreck on the coast of the Californias.
1622: A map by Michiel Colijn of Amsterdam showed California as a peninsula rather than an island. Previous maps show the Gulf terminating in its correct location.
1690s–1800s: Spanish settlement and colonization in lower Las Californias (Baja California peninsula), the first Spanish missions in Baja California are established by Jesuit missionaries.
1701: Explorations by Eusebio Kino expanded knowledge of the Gulf of California coast. Kino did not believe California was an island.
1767: Jesuits expelled; Franciscans take over the Baja missions.
1769: Franciscans go with the Portola expedition to establish new missions in Alta California. Control of the existing Baja missions passes to the Dominican Order.
1773: Francisco Palóu's line demarcates Franciscan and Dominican areas of mission control.
1804: Las Californias divided into Alta ("Upper") and Baja ("Lower") California, using Palóu's line.
1810–1821: Mexican War of Independence
1821: First Mexican Empire, Baja California Territory established, covering Baja California peninsula.
1847: The Battle of La Paz and the Siege of La Paz occurs, as well as several other engagements.
1848: Treaty of Guadalupe Hidalgo cedes Alta California to the United States. As a U.S. territory it receives the California Gold Rush, causing increased maritime traffic along the peninsula.
1850: California admitted to U.S. statehood.
1853: William Walker, with 45 men, captures the capital city of La Paz and declares himself President of the Republic of Lower California. Mexico forces him to retreat a few months later.
1930–31: The Territory of Baja California is further divided into Northern and Southern territories (North Territory of Baja California and South Territory of Baja California).
1952: The North Territory of Baja California becomes the 29th State of Mexico, Baja California. The southern portion, below 28°N, remains a federally administered territory.
It is the first paved road that spans the entire peninsula. The highway was built by the Mexican government to improve Baja California's economy and increase tourism.
1974: The South Territory of Baja California becomes the 31st state, Baja California Sur.
 As of 2000, the five most common indigenous languages in Baja are Mixteco, Zapoteco, Náhuatl, Purépecha, and Triqui.

Political divisions

The province of the Californias was united until 1804, in the Spanish colonial Viceroyalty of New Spain, when it was divided into Alta (upper) and Baja (lower) California.

The two Californias division was kept after Mexican independence in 1821. The Spanish Baja California Province became Mexican Baja California Territory, and remained a separate territory until 1836. In 1836, the Siete Leyes constitutional reforms reunited both Californias in the Departamento de las Californias. After 1848, the Baja California peninsula again became a Mexican territory when Alta California was ceded to the United States (see 1854 map).

In 1931 Baja California Territory was divided into northern and southern territories. In 1952, the "North Territory of Baja California" became the 29th State of Mexico as Baja California. In 1974, the "South Territory of Baja California" became the 31st state as Baja California Sur.

Baja California

The northern part is the state of Baja California. It is sometimes informally referred to as Baja California Norte, to distinguish it from both the Baja California peninsula and the adjacent state Baja California Sur. The citizens of Baja California are named bajacalifornianos ("Lower Californians" in English). Mexicali is the capital.

Baja California Sur

The southern part, below 28° north, is the state of Baja California Sur. The citizens of Baja California Sur are named sudcalifornianos ("South Californians" in English). La Paz is its capital.

Geology

The Baja California peninsula was once a part of the North American Plate, the tectonic plate of which mainland Mexico remains a part. About 12 to 15 million years ago the East Pacific Rise began cutting into the margin of the North American Plate, initiating the separation of the peninsula from it. Spreading within the Gulf of California consists of short oblique rifts or ridge segments connected by long northwest trending transform faults, which together comprise the Gulf of California Rift Zone. The north end of the rift zone is located in the Brawley seismic zone in the Salton Sea basin between the Imperial Fault and the San Andreas Fault. The Baja California peninsula is now part of the Pacific Plate and is moving with it away from the East Pacific Rise in a north northwestward direction.

Along the coast north of Santa Rosalia, Baja California Sur is a prominent volcanic activity area.

Volcanoes of the peninsula and adjacent islands include:
Volcanoes of east-central Baja California
Cerro Prieto
The San Quintín Volcanic Field
Isla San Luis
Jaraguay volcanic field
Coronado
Guadalupe
San Borja volcanic field
El Aguajito
Tres Vírgenes
Isla Tortuga
Comondú-La Purísima

Researchers from Scripps Institution of Oceanography have found a 2,000-year-old layer of non-decomposed roots, or peat, up to  under the desert mangroves. The peat layer acts like a sponge for stored atmospheric carbon, a record of sea-level-rise is also recorded in the peat layer.

The desert mangroves restricted to rocky inlets on the rugged coast of Baja California have been growing over their own root remains over thousands of years to compensate for sea-level rise, accumulating a thick layer of peat below their roots. However, mangroves in flat coastal floodplains have accumulated a thinner peat layer.

Geography

The Peninsular Ranges form the backbone of the peninsula. They are an uplifted and eroded Jurassic to Cretaceous batholith, part of the same original batholith chain which formed much of the Sierra Nevada mountains in U.S. California. This chain was formed primarily as a result of the subduction of the Farallon Plate millions of years ago all along the margin of North America.
   
The Sierra de Juárez is the northernmost range in Mexico.
The Sierra San Pedro Mártir runs south of the Sierra Juarez and includes the peninsula's highest peak, the Picacho del Diablo.
The Sierra de San Borja runs south of the Sierra San Pedro Martir.
The volcanic complex of Tres Virgenes lies in Baja California Sur, near the border with the state of Baja California, forming the ranges south of the Sierra de San Borja.
The Sierra de la Giganta runs along the shore of the Gulf of California south of the Tres Virgenes complex.
At the south end of Baja California Sur, the Sierra de la Laguna forms an isolated mountain range rising to 
Another isolated range, the Sierra Vizcaino, juts out into the Pacific between Punta Eugenia and Punta Abreojos.

The two most prominent capes along the Pacific coastline of the peninsula are Punta Eugenia, located about halfway up the coast, and Cabo San Lazaro, located about a quarter of the way north from Cabo San Lucas.

The Bahia Sebastian Vizcaino, the largest bay in Baja, lies along the Pacific coast halfway up the peninsula. The large island of Isla Cedros is situated between the bay and the Pacific, just north of Punta Eugenia. Onshore southeast of the bay is the Desierto de Vizcaino, an extensive desert lying between the Sierra Vizcaino to the west, and the Tres Virgenes range which runs along the Gulf of California to the east.

The largest bays along the coastline of the Gulf are Bahia de La Paz where the city of La Paz is located, and Bahia Concepcion. The Bahía de los Ángeles is a small bay located west of the Canal de las Ballenas which separates the Baja California peninsula from the large island of Angel de la Guarda in the Gulf of California.

Ecoregions

The peninsula is home to several distinct ecoregions. Most of the peninsula is deserts and xeric shrublands, although pine-oak forests are found in the mountains at the northern and southern ends of the peninsula. The southern tip of the peninsula, which was formerly an island, has many species with affinities to tropical Mexico.
 California chaparral and woodlands, which covers the Mediterranean climate northwestern corner of the peninsula, as well as Cedros and Guadalupe islands.
 Sierra Juarez and San Pedro Martir pine-oak forests in the upper reaches of the Sierra Juárez and Sierra San Pedro Mártir ranges in the northern peninsula.
 The Sonoran Desert extends into the northeastern portion of the state, east of the Sierra Juárez and Sierra San Pedro Mártir ranges.
 The Baja California Desert extends west of the Peninsular Ranges along the Pacific side of the peninsula for most of its length, and includes the El Vizcaíno Desert and El Vizcaíno Biosphere Reserve.
 The Gulf of California xeric scrub extends along the Gulf of California side of the peninsula for most of its length.
 San Lucan xeric scrub lies in the lowlands of the peninsula's southern tip.
 Sierra de la Laguna dry forests are found on the lower slopes of the Sierra de la Laguna.
 Sierra de la Laguna pine-oak forests are found at higher elevations in the Sierra de la Laguna.
 The Bahía de los Ángeles Biosphere Reserve

Tourism
The peninsula is known colloquially as Baja by American and Canadian tourists, and is known for its natural environment. It draws ecotourists who go whale watching for migrating California gray whales as well as tourists that arrive to the resorts on the southern tip of the peninsula. Its location between the North Pacific and Gulf of California give it a reputation for sports fishing. Since 1967, the peninsula has hosted the Baja 1000, an off-road race that begins in Ensenada and ends in La Paz.

See also
 Ferdinand Konščak
 Gulf of California Rift Zone
 Spanish missions in Baja California
 The Californias

References

Notes

Sources 
 Baja California State Government: History

Further reading 
  An anthology of writings that describe Baja California, and the Gulf of California, from sources dated from the mid-sixteenth century to present.

External links

 
 

 
Peninsulas of Mexico
 
 
Gulf of California
Pacific Coast of Mexico

Colonial Mexico
Mexican California